Festival of Perun, Perun's Day, Perunica is a Slavic festival in honor of the god Perun celebrated by modern Slavic neopagans (rodnovers); its existence in times before the Slavs began to be Christianized remains hypothetical.

Origin of the holiday 
The existence of the cult in pre-Christian times is a hypothesis put forward as part of Boris Rybakov's interpretation of the ornamentation of archaeological artefacts. The cult of Perun was probably replaced by the cult of the prophet Elijah among the Kyiv boyars in the process of Christianization of Rus. Elijah's Day, celebrated in Christian times on July 20, bore distinct features of ancient pagan cults, and it is presumed that it replaced the original festival in honor of the god of thunder Perun. In popular belief Elijah wields storm clouds to influence the fertility of the fields and uses lightning against demons and blasphemers.

Traditions 

The festival is celebrated on July 20 or 21 by the neopagans in Poland within registered religious organizations, as well as informal communities, and also in other Slavic countries, including Ukraine, Slovakia, and Russia, where in some groups of rodnovers this holiday is regarded as the most important of the year. During the festival there are games (sports competitions) in honor of Perun, during which participants compete in such disciplines as combat sports and tug-of-war.

See also 
 Festival of Veles

References

Bibliography 
 
 
 
 

Slavic holidays
Modern pagan holidays
Slavic Native Faith